AICR may refer to:
American Institute for Cancer Research, an American-based organization
Association for International Cancer Research, a British-based organization